Vangellino L. Sastromedjo (born 25 March 1984) is a Surinamese professional footballer who plays as a midfielder for SVB Eerste Divisie club Bintang Lahir. He also plays futsal for The Lions and the Suriname national futsal team.

Formerly an international for Suriname, Sastromedjo has represented his country in FIFA World Cup qualification matches. He is of Javanese descent.

International career 
Sastromedjo scored 2 goals in 19 games for the Suriname national football team.

International goals 

 Suriname score listed first, score column indicates score after each Sastromedjo goal.

Honours

Club

WBC
SVB Hoofdklasse: 2008–09
SVB Cup: 2008–09
Suriname President's Cup: 2009

Futsal

S.C.V. LINCO
SZVB Hoofdklasse: 2011
The Lions
SZVB Hoofdklasse: 2020

References

External links 
 
 
 

1984 births
Living people
Surinamese people of Indonesian descent
Surinamese people of Javanese descent
Surinamese men's futsal players
Sportspeople from Paramaribo
Surinamese footballers
Suriname international footballers
SVB Eerste Divisie players
S.V. Leo Victor players
FCS Nacional players
S.V. Walking Boyz Company players
S.C.V. Bintang Lahir players
Association football midfielders